Loricariichthys is a genus of catfishes (order Siluriformes) of the family Loricariidae.

Taxonomy
This genus is part of the Loricariichthys group within the subfamily Loricariinae; this group also includes the genera Furcodontichthys, Hemiodontichthys, Limatulichthys, and Pseudoloricaria. Loricariichthys seems to be intermediate between Limatulichthys and Pseudoloricaria on one hand, and Furcodontichthys and Hemiodontichthys on the other. Although this genus is well diagnosed, the species are very similar and difficult to identify.

Species
There are currently 18 recognized species in this genus:
 Loricariichthys acutus (Valenciennes, 1840)
 Loricariichthys anus (Valenciennes, 1835)
 Loricariichthys brunneus (Hancock, 1828)
 Loricariichthys cashibo (C. H. Eigenmann & W. R. Allen, 1942)
 Loricariichthys castaneus (Castelnau, 1855)
 Loricariichthys chanjoo (Fowler, 1940)
 Loricariichthys derbyi Fowler, 1915
 Loricariichthys edentatus R. E. dos Reis & E. H. L. Pereira, 2000
 Loricariichthys hauxwelli Fowler, 1915
 Loricariichthys labialis (Boulenger, 1895)
 Loricariichthys maculatus (Bloch, 1794)
 Loricariichthys melanocheilus R. E. dos Reis & E. H. L. Pereira, 2000
 Loricariichthys microdon (C. H. Eigenmann, 1909)
 Loricariichthys nudirostris (Kner, 1853)
 Loricariichthys platymetopon Isbrücker & Nijssen, 1979
 Loricariichthys rostratus R. E. dos Reis & E. H. L. Pereira, 2000
 Loricariichthys stuebelii (Steindachner, 1882)
 Loricariichthys ucayalensis Regan, 1913

Distribution

Loricariichthys is distributed in most major freshwater drainages east of the Andes and north of Buenos Aires. Loricariichthys is widely distributed in the Amazon basin, the Paraná system, and coastal rivers of the Guiana and Brazilian Shields.

Description
An accessory respiration organ, consisting of a double respiratory purse connected to the distal end of the esophagus, is present in a number of species of Loricariichthys.

The lower lip of immature males and females has two thick, cushionlike structures, which are covered with small papillae and have irregular fringes along the posterior edge. However, in nuptial males of Loricariichthys, the cushionlike structures on the lower lip recede or even disappear, and the lip becomes wider and longer and becomes smooth or covered with minute papillae. Males use this enlarged lower lip to clasp and carry a cluster of developing eggs. This method of carrying eggs is possibly a strategy to protect the eggs from predation, since these fishes commonly live in exposed sandy- or muddy-bottomed environments devoid of places to hide.

A diploid number of 2n = 56 has been reported for two species characterized. A ZZ/ZW sex chromosome system was also reported for L. platymetopon.

Ecology
These species occur in a large diversity of habitat over sandy and muddy bottoms. Like other members of the Loricariichthys group, Loricariichthys species are lip brooders. The male holds the clutch of eggs in a large membranous extension of the lower lip.

References

Loricariini
Fish of South America
Fish of the Amazon basin
Catfish genera
Taxa named by Pieter Bleeker
Freshwater fish genera